Taman Johor Jaya is a suburb in Johor Bahru, Johor, Malaysia. Johor Jaya consists of mainly residential zones, but it also has light industrial and commercial zones.

Development history

Johor Jaya was developed by Housing Developer Daiman Development Berhad, a subsidiary of Daiman Group. Construction and development works started in 1983. The first phase of development focused mainly on the construction of single storey terrace houses. Construction of the houses completed in 1987, but residents were initially hesitant to move into their houses due to reports of house break-ins. Daiman subsequently announced plans in January 1989 to develop the next 3 phases in Anggerik, Dedap and Teratai. Plans were made to build single and double storey terrace houses, shophouses and a sports complex. Development of these 3 phases completed by 1992, and there were some 11,132 residential houses built by then. The then-general manager of Daiman Group, Tan Yeong Kan quoted that the completion of the development phases were fuelled by their company's cash surpluses with no borrowings. Development of the Keembong and Seroja phases followed suit between 1992 and 1993. The development of the final phase of Johor Jaya around Jalan Rosemerah Utama began in the mid-1990s and concluded with the construction of build-to-order bungalows in the area to the west of the Daiman Golf Course in 1998.

The Family Food Centre was built in 2004 along Jalan Dedap 14 serving various type of common Malay cuisine. A new neighbouring megamall, ÆON Tebrau City, was built in 2005 along Tebrau Highway. Other neighbouring hypermarkets include Giant in Plentong and ÆON Big along Tebrau Highway, just south of ÆON. The At-Taqwa Mosque, which was built in 2009, is located along Jalan Dedap 10. Johor Jaya new police station is in Rosmerah. There is also a Hindu Temple located beside the police station.

Demographics

Most of Johor Jaya's residents are Malays (51.7%), followed by Chinese (40.9%) and Indians (6.8%).

Shopping
 
Johor Jaya's key shopping district is located Dedap phase, and is home to various SMEs that consisted of eateries, pubs and car repair shops. Morning markets set up by street vendors are also a common sight on Sunday mornings, although some of the vendors are illegal and shoppers have complained of traffic congestion problems. Durian vendors also make their presence felt between June and August, which are brought in from Bentong, Pahang.

Restaurant outlets

 Lavender's bistro & cake shop, Jalan Dedap 3
 Season's Cafe, Jalan Dedap 4
 Hong Kong Boy restaurant, Jalan Dedap 22

Retail outlets

 Giant Hypermarket, Jalan Masai Lama/Jalan Johor Jaya
 Nurture Supermarket, Jalan Dedap 14
 The Store Johor Jaya, Jalan Dedap 4
 Tesco Hypermarket, Plentong
 Tesco Hypermarket, Tebrau
 The Store Hypermarket, Pandan 
 ÆON Big Hypermarket, Pandan (Previously known as Carrefour Hypermarket)
 ÆON Mall Tebrau City (Previously known as Jusco Tebrau City)
 Econsave Cash and Carry, Desa Cemerlang
 SENTAI, Jalan Seroja 37 (Household, Restaurant and Hotel supplies)

Education

 SJK (C) Johor Jaya, Jalan Rosmerah 5/1
 SK Taman Johor Jaya 1, Jalan Bakawali 20
 SK Taman Johor Jaya 2, Jalan Keembong 43
 SK Taman Johor Jaya 3, Jalan Teratai 50
 SK Taman Johor Jaya 5, Jalan Anggerik 21
 SMK Agama Johor Bahru, Jalan Anggerik 21
 SMK Taman Johor Jaya 1, Jalan Bakawali 75
 SMK Taman Johor Jaya 2, Jalan Teratai 32

Transportation

The suburb is accessible by Causeway Link route 6B from Johor Bahru Sentral railway station.

References

External links

Central Johor Bahru Municipal Council - administrator of Taman Johor Jaya

Johor Bahru housing estates
Towns and suburbs in Johor Bahru District
Populated places in Johor